Armando López-Torres (22 February 1928 – 25 February 2001) was a Peruvian sports shooter. He competed at the 1956 Summer Olympics and the 1964 Summer Olympics.

References

External links
 

1928 births
2001 deaths
Peruvian male sport shooters
Olympic shooters of Peru
Shooters at the 1956 Summer Olympics
Shooters at the 1964 Summer Olympics
Place of birth missing
20th-century Peruvian people